Alexander Titov may refer to:

 Alexander Titov (conductor) (born 1954), Russian conductor working regularly with orchestras in St Petersburg, Moscow, and with the BBC Scottish Symphony Orchestra
 Alexander Titov (ice hockey) (born 1975), retired Russian ice hockey defenceman
 Alexander Titov (rock musician) (born 1957), Russian rock musician